Odysseas (Odysseus) Eskitzoglou (3 May 1932 – 26 August 2018) was a Greek sailor and Olympic athlete. He competed at the 1960 Summer Olympics in Rome and won a gold medal in the Dragon class with Crown Prince Konstantinos and Georgios Zaimis on the boat Nireus. Along with his fellow crew members of Nireus, he was named one of the 1960 Greek Athletes of the Year.

At the 1964 Summer Olympics in Tokyo, he and his crew took 8th place for Greece in the Dragon class, with the boat Proteus II.

References

1932 births
2018 deaths
Greek male sailors (sport)
Sailors at the 1960 Summer Olympics – Dragon
Sailors at the 1964 Summer Olympics – Dragon
Sailors at the 1968 Summer Olympics – Dragon
Olympic sailors of Greece
Olympic gold medalists for Greece
Olympic medalists in sailing
Medalists at the 1960 Summer Olympics
Sailors (sport) from Piraeus